Regional Spinal Injury Centre is a medical institution which provides rehabilitation measures to patients with Spinal disabilities  and also with orthopedic and Neurological problems. It was established at Cuttack and have four offices in India.

Regional Spinal Injury Centre (RSIC) is set up at Cuttack (Orissa), Jabalpur(Madhya Pradesh), Mohali(Punjab), Bareliey(Uttar Pradesh)

References

Hospitals in Odisha
Hospitals in Madhya Pradesh
Hospitals in Punjab, India
Hospitals in Uttar Pradesh
1971 establishments in Orissa